Medical World News was an American magazine for the medical profession. It was published between 1960 and 1994.

History and profile
Medical World News was founded in April 1960 by Maxwell M Geffen, a New York publisher. The founding editor of Medical World News was Morris Fishbein. The magazine was later sold to McGraw-Hill and in March 1981 it was sold by McGraw-Hill to Hospital Equities, an operator of health care facilities. Miller Freeman acquired the magazine from Hospital Equities. In 1994 the magazine ceased publication.

In 1985 McGovern Center for Historical Collections (endowed by John P. McGovern) acquired an archive of photographs from Medical World News. This archive is accessible at The Texas Medical Center Library in Houston.

In 2020, a digital video-based version of Medical World News was launch by MJH Life Sciences. The company, under the name of Intellisphere, obtained and filed the copyright for the title in 2013.

References

External links
Zero Impact Factor from ResearchGate
 1965 Time Magazine article

Business magazines published in the United States
Defunct magazines published in the United States
Health magazines
Magazines established in 1960
Magazines disestablished in 1994
Magazines published in Florida
Medical magazines
Professional and trade magazines